Udupi District Stadium or Ajjarakadu Mahatma Gandhi District Stadium is a multi-purposed stadium located in Udupi, Karnataka. The stadium has capacity of 10,000 spectators. The stadium is a venue for cricket & football tournaments, fairs & exhibition. The stadium underwent a major reconstruction which cost  2 crore under Rajiv Gandhi Khel Abhiyan Mission.  The stadium contains an 8-lane 400m running synthetic athletic track, a 10-lane 100m sprinting track and a 4-lane synthetic warm-up track. Inside the athletic tracks lies a Football field.

References

External links 

 Wikimapia

Udupi
Cricket grounds in Karnataka
2015 establishments in Karnataka
Buildings and structures in Udupi district